Master Khan is a fictional supervillain appearing in American comic books published by Marvel Comics, a recurring foe of Iron Fist and Luke Cage. He first appeared in Strange Tales #77 (October 1960), and was created by Stan Lee and Steve Ditko.

Within the shared universe of that company's publications, Master Khan is a sinister sorcerer "god" of K'un-L'un who demands human blood sacrifices from his worshippers.

Publication history
Master Khan first appeared in Strange Tales #77 (October 1960), and was created by Stan Lee and Steve Ditko.

Namor, the Sub-Mariner writer/artist John Byrne credits Roger Stern with coming up with the idea that the mysterious Tyrone King was really Master Khan.

Fictional character biography
Khan was a notable adversary early in Iron Fist's career, fighting Iron Fist, Luke Cage, Colleen Wing, and Misty Knight on numerous occasions as well as sending his agent Scimitar against them.  When Khan stole the Sons of the Tiger's tiger talismans, he badly injured Bob Diamond.

Magic was used to turn a K'un-Lun wolf into Ferocia who Master Khan took in as a minion.

Later, when Iron Fist contracted radiation poisoning, Luke Cage took him to K'un-L'un for treatment. While there, Iron Fist was secretly replaced by a doppelgänger of the plantlike H'ylthri race, K'un-Lun's ancient enemies. Soon after their return to the outside world, the doppelgänger is destroyed as a result of a bizarre scheme engineered by Master Khan. Cage is blamed for the apparent murder of Iron Fist.

Namor traveled to K'un-L'un, where he found Iron Fist, who had been presumed dead for many months. While in stasis with the H'ylthri, Rand managed to focus his chi, curing the cancer. Returning to Earth and investigating the apparent invasion of Earth by the H'ylthri, Namor was forced to fight their captive, Wolverine. The battle was interrupted by Master Khan, who wiped Namor's memory and dumped him in the American Midwest.

Namor was missing for almost a year, until Namorita tracked him down using a psychic link to him she had recently discovered. Namor did not regain his memory until sometime afterward, when he was captured by Doctor Doom. The ship Doom had used to do so was then magically imprisoned in a bottle by Master Khan, who then assumed Namor's form and sold off much of Oracle's holdings. Namor soon broke the bottle and the spell, and killed Khan.

Powers and abilities
Master Khan has magical powers that enable him to distort reality, levitate, and shrink objects and beings.  He can also alter his appearance, form shields, fire energy blasts. He calls on the mystic principalities, such as Cyttorak, the Faltine, and Raggadorr, for power.

References

External links
 Master Khan at Marvel Wiki
 

Characters created by Chris Claremont
Characters created by John Byrne (comics)
Characters created by Stan Lee
Characters created by Steve Ditko
Comics characters introduced in 1960
Marvel Comics characters who use magic
Marvel Comics supervillains